Ingólfsdóttir is a patronymic. Notable people with the surname include:

 Kristín Ingólfsdóttir (born 1954), Icelandic scientist
 Ragna Ingólfsdóttir (born 1983), Icelandic badminton player
 Rósa Ingólfsdóttir (born 1947), Icelandic actress

Icelandic-language surnames